Kael Koemets (also Karp Koemets; 23 November 1878 Vana-Antsla Parish, Võru County – 8 January 1948 Meremäe Parish, Võru County) was an Estonian politician. He was a member of I Riigikogu.

References

1878 births
1948 deaths
Members of the Riigikogu, 1920–1923
People from Antsla Parish